The Pennsylvania Cyber Charter School, known simply as PA Cyber, is a public cyber charter school founded in Midland, Pennsylvania in 2000.

Regional Office locations 
Allentown, Pennsylvania
Erie, Pennsylvania
Greensburg, Pennsylvania
Harrisburg, Pennsylvania
Midland, Pennsylvania
Philadelphia, Pennsylvania
Pittsburgh, Pennsylvania
State College, Pennsylvania
Warrendale, Pennsylvania
Wilkes-Barre, Pennsylvania

Alumni 
Gabby Barrett, country singer
Sabrina Carpenter, actress and singer
Alex Kirilloff, MLB outfielder for the Minnesota Twins
Alison Riske, tennis player

Notable staff 

 Ellis Cannon, talk show host, teacher at the Ellis Cannon Academy of Sports Media and Broadcasting

References

Public elementary schools in Pennsylvania
Public high schools in Pennsylvania
Charter schools in Pennsylvania
Educational institutions established in 2000
School districts in Beaver County, Pennsylvania
Education in Pittsburgh area
Public middle schools in Pennsylvania
2000 establishments in Pennsylvania